Loretta Lynn's Greatest Hits, Vol. II is a compilation album by American country music singer-songwriter Loretta Lynn. It was released on May 13, 1974, by MCA Records. The album is made up of Lynn's biggest hits between 1968 and 1973.

Critical reception

In the issue dated May 25, 1975, Billboard published a review that said, "This attractive album is exactly what it says it is; an album of Loretta's greatest hits, ranging from "Love Is the Foundation" to "Hey Loretta"."

Cashbox also published a review in their May 25 issue which said, "The sparkling and effervescent quality of Loretta's voice marks her as truly one of the freshest and unique talents on the country music scene. With an
approach to music that is vivacious and full of life, Loretta gives her music a heartfelt sincerity that makes listening to her always a fine treat. This new LP is a stunning collection of her greatest hits all put together in this great package. Six cuts out of the eleven songs on the album were penned by Loretta Lynn herself. Included are "One's on the Way", "Your Squaw Is on the Warpath", "Hey Loretta", "Love Is the Foundation", "You're Lookin' at Country", and "I Wanna Be Free"."

Commercial performance 
The album peaked at No. 5 on the US Billboard Hot Country LP's chart. The album became Lynn's fourth album to receive a Gold certification from the RIAA, which is awarded to an album that has sold 500,000 copies or more.

Track listing

Personnel
Adapted from the album liner notes and Decca and MCA recording session records.
Pete Axthelm – liner notes
Willie Ackerman – drums
Larry Barbier – photography
Harold Bradley – bass guitar, electric bass guitar
Owen Bradley – producer
Floyd Cramer – piano
Ray Edenton – acoustic guitar, electric guitar
Larry Estes – drums
Buddy Harman – drums
Junior Huskey – bass
The Jordanaires – background vocals
Billy Linneman – bass
Loretta Lynn – lead vocals
Grady Martin – guitar, lead electric guitar
Charlie McCoy – harmonica
Bob Moore – bass
Harold Morrison – banjo
Norbert Putnam – bass
Hargus Robbins – piano
Hal Rugg – steel guitar
Jerry Smith – piano
Bob Thompson – banjo
Dave Thornhill – guitar
Pete Wade – guitar
Joe Zinkan – bass

Charts

Certifications

References 

1974 greatest hits albums
Loretta Lynn compilation albums
Albums produced by Owen Bradley
MCA Records compilation albums